Jan Ješek Ptáček of Pirkštein was a Moravian noble and lord of Sloup v Čechách, Polná, and Rataje nad Sázavou.

Biography
The son of Čeněk of Oybin, Jan Ješek inherited the castles at Sloup v Čechách and Polná. He later acquired the town of Rataje nad Sázavou and its two castles, renaming the lower castle Pirkštejn. It was around this time where Jan Ješek started using the name Ptáček, or "Birdie", which was continually used in his lineage.

Jan Ješek was around 50 years old when his son, Jan Ptáček of Pirkstein, was born. Soon after, he returned to Polná and retired from political life. He died around the end of the 14th century.

In popular culture
Jan is mentioned in the video game Kingdom Come: Deliverance as  Sir Jeschke, the father of Hans Capon.

Notes

References

Moravian nobility